Marter Township is an unincorporated geographic township in the Unorganized West part of Timiskaming District in Northeastern Ontario, Canada. The township is named for George Frederick Marter.

The mouth of the Englehart River at the Blanche River is located in the township; the Blanche River flows from the northwest corner to the south centre border of the township. The community of Marter is in the centre of the township. Ontario Highway 624 runs north-south through the middle of the township.

References

Other map sources:

Geographic townships in Ontario
Geography of Timiskaming District